Moses and his Ethiopian wife Zipporah (Dutch: Mozes en zijn Ethiopische vrouw Seporah),  1645–1650, is a painting by Jacob Jordaens, a Flemish Baroque painter. The painting is a half-length depiction of the biblical prophet Moses, and his African wife.

The oil on canvas painting is kept at the Rubenshuis museum in Antwerp, Belgium.

Description
Moses, a white man with dark hair, stands in the foreground, his right hand palm up and his left hand on the Tablets of Stone. The tablets are in shadow, their contents, the Ten Commandments, are unreadable. Behind him to his right stands his wife, a black woman—possibly Zipporah. Her right hand is to her chest. The ribbons in her hat resemble a cross.

Inspiration
Book of Numbers 12:1 states that Moses was criticized by his older siblings for having married a "Cushite woman", Aethiopissa in the Latin Vulgate Bible version. One interpretation of this verse is that Moses' wife Zipporah, daughter of Reuel/Jethro from Midian, was black. Another interpretation is that Moses married more than once. Jordaens' view is unknown, and the painting has been exhibited under titles without the name Zipporah.

Jordaens likely encountered the tale of Moses' wife in contemporary translations of the Bible and the writings of Josephus. Possibly he had also come into contact with the Jesuit Alonso de Sandoval's works on Africa. Contemporary artists who also included black women in their paintings probably inspired him too, such as Jan van den Hoecke's Sybil Agrippina.

Jordaens likely made the painting not on commission, but for himself or a close friend.

Interpretation
Art historian Elizabeth McGrath says that

Moses defends his black wife before the viewer, not his brother and sister. It is from the viewer that the Ethiopian woman draws back, questioning, puzzled and perhaps a little fearful. By his brilliant exploitation of the device of inclusion and confrontation, Jordaens gives the subject a pointed relevance, challenging Christians of his day to accept Moses's Ethiopian, as Miriam and Aaron could not, not just as a representative of pagan wisdom, a shadowed image of their own Church, but as a neighbour, in herself.

See also
 Cushi, word generally used in the Hebrew Bible to refer to a dark-skinned person of African descent
 Tharbis, according to Josephus a wife of Moses

Notes

References

17th-century paintings
Paintings by Jacob Jordaens
Paintings depicting Moses
Black people in art
Ten Commandments in art